Oxxo (stylized as OXXO) is a Mexican chain of convenience stores, with over 21,000 stores across Latin America. It is the largest chain of convenience stores in Latin America. Its headquarters are in Monterrey, Nuevo León.

It is wholly owned by the beverage company FEMSA (Fomento Económico Mexicano).

History 
OXXO was founded in Monterrey in 1976. In the first stores, the only products sold were beer, snacks and cigars. The success of the stores was such that the project kept growing and OXXO built new locations rapidly, becoming a ubiquitous presence in Mexican cities and towns.

The first official OXXO store was opened in 1979 in Monterrey. OXXO stores then spread to Chihuahua, Hermosillo and Nuevo Laredo. Throughout the eighties, OXXO gained fame in the cities where it was established. In 1998, the 1000th store was opened. On July 6, 2010, the opening of the 9000th store, in Oaxaca, was announced. With Mexico liberalizing its oil and gas market, OXXO has started to open gas stations as well. The first station opened in San Pedro Garza Garcia. In 2019, Oxxo Gas aimed to rebrand 49 additional stations, mostly in Monterrey, that were operating under the Pemex name.

As of 2014, Oxxo was reported to have more than 15,000 stores across Mexico.  In the same year, a partnership between Oxxo and Amazon was announced, involving Amazon accepting Oxxo's prepaid debit cards as a payment method, and Amazon gift cards being sold at Oxxo stores.

Gallery

See also

 Convenience stores
 List of companies of Mexico

References

External links

 OXXO official site
 OXXO Inmuebles official site 

Retail companies established in 1977
Convenience stores
Retail companies of Mexico
Companies based in Monterrey
Mexican companies established in 1977
Automotive fuel retailers